The 2009–10 Vermont Catamounts men's basketball team represented the University of Vermont in the 2009–10 NCAA Division I men's basketball season. The Catamounts won the America East conference tournament title for the first time since 2005 to earn the conference’s automatic berth in the NCAA tournament. The Catamounts lost in the first round to No. 1 seed Syracuse, 79–56.

Roster

Schedule and results

|-
!colspan=12 style=| Regular season

|-
!colspan=9 style=| America East tournament

|-
!colspan=9 style=| NCAA Tournament

References

Vermont
Vermont Catamounts men's basketball seasons
Vermont
Cat
Cat